Maurolicus weitzmani, commonly known as the Atlantic pearlside, is a species of ray-finned fish in the genus Maurolicus. It lives in the Atlantic Ocean.

References 

Fish described in 1993
Sternoptychidae